Get Up And Dance is a November 2011 video game that was released for Wii and PlayStation 3, developed by British studio Gusto Games. The game includes 30 songs in the track list. It includes tracks like What You Waiting For by Gwen Stefani and Achy Breaky Heart by Billy Ray Cyrus.

Soundtrack

References

2011 video games
Dance video games
PlayStation 3 games
Video games developed in the United Kingdom
Wii games